The 2017 Visit Panamá Cup will be a professional tennis tournament played on clay courts. It will be the fourth edition of the tournament which will be part of the 2017 ATP Challenger Tour. It will take place in Panama City, Panama between 3 and 8 April 2017.

Point distribution

Singles main-draw entrants

Seeds

 1 Rankings are as of March 20, 2017.

Other entrants
The following players received wildcards into the singles main draw:
  Mateo Galdón
  José Gilbert Gómez
  Miomir Kecmanović
  Oliver Marach

The following player received entry into the singles main draw using a protected ranking:
  Bradley Klahn

The following players received entry from the qualifying draw:
  Bjorn Fratangelo
  Kevin Krawietz
  Tomás Lipovšek Puches
  Péter Nagy

Champions

Singles

 Rogério Dutra Silva def.  Peđa Krstin 6–2, 6–4.

Doubles

 Sergio Galdós /  Caio Zampieri def.  Kevin Krawietz /  Adrián Menéndez Maceiras 1–6, 7–6(7–5), [10–7].

References

Visit Panamá Cup
Visit Panamá Cup
Visit Panamá Cup